Henry Radclyffe, 2nd Earl of Sussex, KG (also spelt "Radcliffe") (1507 – 17 February 1557) was a son of Robert Radclyffe, 1st Earl of Sussex and his wife Elizabeth Stafford, Countess of Sussex.

Marriages and children
He was first married to Elizabeth Howard, a daughter of Thomas Howard, 2nd Duke of Norfolk and his second wife Agnes Tilney. They had two sons:

Thomas Radclyffe, 3rd Earl of Sussex (c. 1525 – 9 June 1583).
Henry Radclyffe, 4th Earl of Sussex (c. 1532–1593).

The Complete Peerage gives the date of death for his first wife as 18 September 1534. Burke's Peerage agrees on the date but changes the year to 1537. Either way, Henry would not remain a widower for long.

He married secondly Anne Calthorpe. The marriage resulted in a divorce or annulment in 1555, but they had two known children:

Egremont Radclyffe (died 1578). He took part in the Rising of the North but escaped to Continental Europe after its failure. He was executed in Namur, accused of attempting to poison John of Austria. John is believed to have died of typhus.
Lady Frances Radclyffe (died 1602). Married Sir Thomas Mildmay, by whom she had two sons.

Earl
On 27 November 1542, his father died and Henry succeeded him as Earl of Sussex. His second cousin Mary I created him a Knight of the Garter in 1554, alongside the later Philip II of Spain, Emmanuel Philibert, Duke of Savoy and William Howard, 1st Baron Howard of Effingham.

He died on 17 February 1557 at Channel Row, Westminster (now known as Canon Row).

References

|-

1507 births
1557 deaths
Earls of Sussex (1529 creation)
Garter Knights appointed by Mary I
16th-century English nobility
Henry
Barons FitzWalter